Simon Agopian or Simon Hagopian at times Simon Agopyan (Western Armenian Սիմոն Յակոբեան, 1857 - 16 May 1921) was a prominent Ottoman Armenian landscape and portrait painter.

Life 

Simon Agopian was born in Samatya, a district in Istanbul in 1857. He completed his early education at the Horenyan School in Narlikapi and the Sahakyan School in Samatya. He took private lessons from the respect Armenian painter Telemak Ekserciyan and entered the Academy of Fine Arts in 1994, graduating in 1888. While studying at the Academy, Agopian was classmates with Armenian painter Arshak Fetvadjian. Upon graduation, Agopian was awarded first place for a large painting entitled The Imperial Gallery at Eminonu which he executed for his finals. This painting was later purchased by Alexander Vallaury, an architect of the late Ottoman period. He continued his work in his studio in Samatya until 1895, and from then on worked in Beyoğlu. His address was 48 Rue Kechich, Feriköy.

From 1883 onward, Agopian taught art at the Berberyan and Mezburyan schools in Üsküdar, and at the Esayan School near Taksim Square. In 1911 his studio was above the Apollan Photography Studio, and one of the portraits commissioned by Apollon was that of Mehmed Resad which is in the Military Museum in Istanbul.  He gave art lessons to the Ottoman princes and other amateurs, and one of his pupils was the painter Vahram Manavyan. An exhibition of his work was help at Angelidis, a shop at 331 Cadde-i Kebir in Beyoğlu in 1896, and his works were last exhibited at the Societa Italiana. He won a prize at the Marseille Exhibition for a portrait of his father.

Simon Agopian died on 16 May 1921 and is buried at the Şişli Armenian Cemetery.

Works 
Important works by Agopyan include The Beggar from Van, Porters Crossing the Bridge in Karaköy, A Muslim Beggar, Turkish Neighborhood, Portrait of Sultan Abdulhamit II, and the Selamlik of Sultan Abdülaziz in Ortaköy (which was sold at an auction of Islamic art held by Ader Picard Tajan in Paris on November 18, 1988), six scenes of the Victory won by Gazi Ahmed Muhtar Pasa, The Medresse of Sofulu Seyyif Mehmed Pasa Mosque in Kadirga, a portrait of educationalist Reteos Berberian, A Dervish Beggar in the Courtyard of Mihrimah Sultan Mosque in Üsküdar (1911), and a portrait of Mahrukizade Cafer Bey (1894; which is owned by his grandson Cem Mahruki). He painted a series of Ottoman military successes in his Six Scenes of Victories of Gazi Ahmed Muhtar Paşa on the Eastern Front (1910) which was commissioned by Ahmed Muhtar Pasha’s family.

He also has paintings of Istanbul tradespeople such as simit sellers, fishmongers, and chimney sweepers. Agopyan also painted religious subjects. Examples of the latter are those portraying two of the apostles, Timothy and Parthugiemeos (1888; which he did for the Surp Kevork Church in Samatya).

Gallery

See also
 List of Orientalist artists
 Orientalism

References 

1857 births
1921 deaths
19th-century painters from the Ottoman Empire
19th-century Armenian painters
20th-century painters from the Ottoman Empire
20th-century Armenian painters
19th-century Ottoman educators
Armenian educators
Orientalist painters
Artists from Istanbul
Landscape painters
Armenian portrait painters
19th-century war artists
20th-century war artists
Burials at Şişli Armenian Cemetery
Armenians from the Ottoman Empire